A local election was held in the Mexican state of  Jalisco on Sunday, July 2, 2006. Voters went to the polls to elect, on the local level:
A new Governor of Jalisco to serve for a six-year term.  Emilio González Márquez (PAN) won.
125 municipal presidents (mayors) to serve for a three-year term.
40 local deputies (20 by the first-past-the-post system and 20 by proportional representation) to serve for a three-year term in the Congress of Jalisco.

Gubernatorial Election
Eight political parties participated in the 2006 Jalisco state election; two of them (the PRD and the PT) joined forces.

Source: Instituto Electoral del Estado de Jalisco

See also
2006 Mexican elections

External links
Electoral Institute of Jalisco website 

Jalisco
Election
Jalisco elections